Toppelius is a surname. Notable people with this surname include:

Meri Toppelius (1863–1896), Finnish-born American educational theorist 
Mikael Toppelius (1734–1821), Finnish painter

See also
Topelius (surname)